Coming Down may refer to:

 "Coming Down" (Richard Fleeshman song)
 "Coming Down" (Five Finger Death Punch song)
 Coming Down (album), an album by Daniel Ash
 "Coming Down", a 2015 song by Halsey from the album Badlands
 "Coming Down", a 2011 song by The Weeknd from the album House of Balloons
 "Coming Down", a 2014 song by Clap Your Hands Say Yeah from the album Only Run
 "Comin' Down", a song by Paula Cole

See also
Going Down (disambiguation)
"It's Coming Down", a song by Cake from the album Fashion Nugget